Kathleen Lake (native name : Mät'àtäna Mǟn meaning 'something frozen inside lake') is a lake in Yukon, Canada, located south of the town of Haines Junction within Kluane National Park and Reserve.  Located at Haines Highway Kilometre 219.7. It hosts a day-use area, a boat launch, a campground, and several hiking trails, including the challenging 3.1 mi (5 km) ascent to King's Throne, a natural, glacially-formed amphitheater overlooking the lake.

Kathleen Lake is characterized by exceptionally clear waters and the presence of kokanee salmon, a landlocked population of sockeye living and reproducing solely in freshwater bodies.

Kathleen Lake was named for a girl from Berwickshire County, Scotland, left behind by William "Scotty" Hume (1868–1950), a North-West Mounted Police constable (Reg. #2259) stationed on the Dalton Trail from 1900 to 1902.

References

Gallery

Lakes of Yukon
Kluane National Park and Reserve